Sir Rory O'Moore (c. 1600 – 16 February 1655), also known Sir Roger O'Moore or O'More or Sir Roger Moore, was an Irish landowner, and is most notable for being one of the four principal organizers of the Irish Rebellion of 1641.

Early life
O'Moore belonged to an ancient Irish noble family descended from  Conall Cernach. He was born in either Laois around 1600, or more likely at Balyna, his father's estate in County Kildare.

O'Moore's uncle Rory O'More, Lord of Laois, had fought against the English during the Tudor conquest of Ireland. In 1556 Queen Mary I confiscated the O'Mores' lands and created "Queens County" (modern-day County Laois). Over 180 family members, who were peaceful and had taken no part in any rebellion, were murdered with virtually all of the leaders of Laois and Offaly by the English at a feast at Mullaghmast, County Kildare in 1577, Rory Óg and his wife Maighréad O'Byrne, sister of Fiach MacHugh O'Byrne, were hunted down and killed soon afterwards. This led to the political downfall of the O'Moore family; their estates were given to English settlers.

Leader of the Rebellion of 1641

Given the causes of the rebellion and the Crown's weakness during the Bishops' Wars into 1641, O'More planned a bloodless coup to overthrow the English government in Ireland. With Connor Maguire, 2nd Baron of Enniskillen he planned to seize Dublin Castle, which was held by a small garrison, on 23 October 1641. Allies in Ulster led by Sir Phelim O'Neill would seize forts and towns there. The leaders would assume the governing of their own country and with this provision offer allegiance to King Charles. They were betrayed, and the plan was discovered on 22 October and the rising failed in its first objective. O'Neill had some success, and O'More quickly succeeded in creating an alliance between the Ulster Gaelic clans and the Old English gentry in Leinster.

In November 1641 the Irish forces besieged Drogheda and a royalist force came north from Dublin to oppose them. O'More was one of the leaders of the rebel army that intercepted and defeated the relief force at the Battle of Julianstown on 29 November.

In the ensuing Irish Confederate Wars, a major achievement by O’Moore was to recruit Owen Roe O'Neill from the Spanish service in 1642. He commanded the Confederate forces in what is now County Laois and County Offaly, which remained peaceful, and helped arrange alliances with Inchiquin in 1647 and Ormonde in 1648. The resulting larger alliance failed to stop the Cromwellian invasion of Ireland (1649–53) in which an estimated third of the Irish population died. 

The Irish historian Charles Gavan Duffy wrote:
{{quote| Then a private gentleman, with no resources beyond his intellect and his courage, this Rory, when Ireland was weakened by defeat and confiscation, and guarded with a jealous care constantly increasing in strictness and severity, conceived the vast design of rescuing the country from England, and even accomplished it; for, in three years, England did not retain a city in Ireland but Dublin and Drogheda, and for eight years the land was possessed and the supreme authority exercised by the Confederation created by O'Moore. History contains no stricter instance of the influence of an individual mind.<ref>Charles Gavan Duffy (editor). 1845. The Ballad Poetry of Ireland</ref> }}

Final years
Bishop Michael Comerford wrote that after O'More's defeat at the Battle of Kilrush in April 1642 he retired and died in Kilkenny city in the winter of 1642–43, having co-founded the Irish Catholic Confederation there a few months earlier. However this ignores his contacts with Inchiquin and Ormonde in 1647–48. Others say that he fled to the island of Inishbofin, County Galway after Galway city fell in 1652. St Colman's Church on the island once bore a tablet with the inscription:

Comerford quoted earlier historians who wrote that a similar watchword in Kildare was: "Our trust is in God and Our Lady, and Rory O'More".

Family
O'More married Jane, daughter of Sir Patrick Barnewall, of Donabate, County Dublin and his second wife Mary Bagenal, and they had two sons and four daughters. 

The Balyna estate was inherited from Calvagh O'More by Rory's brother Lewis. Balyna was passed down to Lewis' last surviving O'More descendant, Letitia, who was also descended from Rory O'More because her grandfather married a second cousin. Letitia married a Richard Farrell in 1751: this Farrell family henceforth took the surname More O'Ferrall.

His daughter Anne, married Patrick Sarsfield from an Old English Catholic family from The Pale. His grandsons included Patrick Sarsfield, 1st Earl of Lucan, who led a Jacobite force in the Williamite War in Ireland, and his brother William Sarsfield, whose descendants include all the Earls of Lucan and the 4th and all subsequent Earls Spencer, through which Rory is an ancestor to Diana, Princess of Wales.

The Rory O'More Bridge in Dublin was renamed after him.

Arts
The film Rory O'More'', made by the Kalem Company in 1911, directed by Sidney Olcott and Robert G. Vignola, set O'More's rebellion in 1798 rather than the 17th century, and moved the action to the Lakes of Killarney.

Notes

References

External links 
 http://www.inishbofin.com/modern-church/
 Rory O'More website dedicated to Sidney Olcott
Rory O'More, the film https://www.youtube.com/watch?v=wJ0_Q1OJ518

People from County Laois
1600s births
1655 deaths
People of the Irish Confederate Wars
Irish generals
Irish Roman Catholic Confederates
17th-century Irish people
O'Moore family
Irish knights
Irish nobility
Irish Rebellion of 1641
17th-century rebels